The Stadio comunale Enzo Blasone is a multi-use stadium in Foligno, Italy. It is currently used mostly for football matches and is the home stadium of Foligno Calcio. It holds 4.650. 

It was built in 1981 - 1982 because of the promotion of Foligno Calcio to Serie C2, the former fourth level of Italian football.

The stadium was originally called "Santo Pietro", which is the name of the area of Foligno it is located in; recently, it has been named after Enzo Blasone, a former footballer and coach of the local team.

External links
Foligno Calcio official web page

Enzo Blasone
Buildings and structures in Foligno
Sports venues in Umbria